The men's 800 metres event was part of the track and field athletics programme at the 1924 Summer Olympics. The competition was held from Sunday, July 6, 1924, to Tuesday, July 8, 1924. As with all other races the track was 500 metres in circumference. Fifty middle distance runners from 24 nations competed.

The event was won by Douglas Lowe of Great Britain. It was the second of four consecutive British victories in the event, and the third overall 800 metres title for Great Britain. Lowe would successfully defend his title four years later, the first man to repeat in the 800 metres. Paul Martin's silver was Switzerland's first medal in the 800 metres.

Background

This was the seventh appearance of the event, which is one of 12 athletics events to have been held at every Summer Olympics. Two finalists from 1920 returned: fourth-place finisher Edgar Mountain of Great Britain and seventh-place finisher Adriaan Paulen of the Netherlands. The favorites for 1924 were Schuyler Enck of the United States (who had the best time in 1924 with 1:53.2), H. B. Stallard of Great Britain (AAA champion), and Paul Martin of Switzerland.

Austria, Brazil, Haiti, Ireland, Mexico, and Poland appeared in the event for the first time. Great Britain and the United States each made their sixth appearance, tied for the most among all nations.

Competition format

The competition used the three-round format introduced in 1912, with the nine-man final introduced in 1920. There were eight first-round heats of between 4 and 7 athletes each; the top three runners in each heat advanced to the semifinals. There were three semifinals with 8 athletes each; the top three runners in each semifinal advanced to the nine-man final.

Records

These were the standing world and Olympic records (in minutes) prior to the 1924 Summer Olympics.

No world or Olympic records were set during the competition.

Schedule

The rounds were each on separate days again, following a one-time experiment with the semifinals and final being held one after the other in 1920.

Results

Round 1

All heats were held on Sunday, July 6, 1924.

The best three finishers of every heat qualified for the semi-finals.

Heat 1

Heat 2

Heat 3

Heat 4

Heat 5

Heat 6

Heat 7

Heat 8

Semifinals

All semi-finals were held on Monday, July 7, 1924.

The best three finishers of every heat qualified for the final.

Semifinal 1

Semifinal 2

Semifinal 3

Final

The final was held on Tuesday, July 8, 1924.

References

External links
Olympic Report
 

800 metres
800 metres at the Olympics